Mimicry Srinivos is an international impressionist (entertainment), ventriloquist and very first sound illusionist from India.
For the past 43 years he performed more than 7000 shows all over India and around the world, including US, UK, UAE, Singapore, Malaysia, Sharjah, Bahrain, Kuwait, Tanzania, Saudi Arabia  Sri Lanka Australia.
He is a disciple of the world-renowned mimic Padmashri Dr. Nerella Venumadhav and learned ventriloquism from Prof. M.M. Roy of Chennai, India and later he graduated in ventriloquism from Mahers institute of ventriloquists, Colorado, US. He is a member of " North American Association of Ventriloquists". He is also known as "Mimikry Srinivas, " Mimicry Sreenivas,
"Mimicry Srinivas" "Mimicry Seenu" and "Mimicry Srinivos". In the year 2013, the Education department of previous combined Andhra Pradesh state (India) included Srinivos' story in Class 8th Physics lesson in the chapter "Sound".

Early life
Sreenivos was born in a small village called Kesamudram in Warangal district of Telangana state in 1961. When he was a kid, got impressed by Dr. Nerella Venumadhav's performance and started practising imitation of various voices. Fortunately, he got an opportunity to learn more and improve his skills when his family moved to Warangal which is the hometown of renowned artist Dr. Venumadhav. Soon he became a favorite disciple of Dr. Venumadhav.  He started performing on stage when he was 15 years old and quickly became a popular artist with his new and bold experiments in mimicry and ventriloquism.
He is also a graphic artist and as a teenager, he ran his own graphic art business 'Navata Arts' in Warangal during the late 70s.

Education
He graduated with 'Bachelor of Arts' from Arts and Science College (affiliated to Kakatiya University), Warangal, Telangana state, India in the year 1982.

Career
Srinivos is the first Indian mimic to perform ventriloquism and sound illusion.
Srinivos has enthralled audiences all over India. He has performed and entertained worldwide, including cities like New York, New Jersey, Philadelphia, Chicago, Springfield (IL), Pittsburgh, Washington D.C., Atlanta, Huntsville, San Francisco, San Jose, Berkeley, Los Angeles, Dallas, Houston, New Orleans, London, Stoke on trent, Dubai, Sharjah, Bahrain, Kuwait, Riyadh, Dammam, Dar es Salaam, Arusha, Colombo, Walatgama, Singapore, Kuala Lumpur, Bagandatho, Kulim, Abu Dhabi, Brisbane, Sydney and Melbourne to name a few.

Srinivos created "Dhwanyavadhaanam", a unique feat in the world history of mimicry in the year 1990, and performed it the first time in the Tyagaraya gana Sabha auditorium in Hyderabad. He was awarded the title Dhwanyavadhaana Samrat.

He set a sensational world record by performing a 32-hour nonstop mimicry show in 1990 at Tyagaraja Ganasabha auditorium in Hyderabad.  It was organized by the Hyderabad Film & Cultural Circle.
It was a very successful show, and at least 50,000 spectators enjoyed that event. It was shown live on big screens outside the auditorium for those who were unable to enter.

He is well known for his presentation skills and most importantly, for his analysis of voices of various movie stars and popular figures, comparing how those voices changed from time to time.  He always says the secret to his success is that he does not do different mimicry but does it differently.  He inspired and taught mimicry and ventriloquism to many popular artists performing in Andhra Pradesh and Telangana States today. Srinivos is often considered the successor to Dr. Venumadhav.
He made the art so popular that 'Mimicry' has become part of his name. Later many mimics in India followed the same trend by adding 'Mimicry' to their name.

His performances include 'Mimicry Jugalbandi' and 'Group Mimicry' and unbelievable items in ventriloquism like Voice Throwing, Sound Perspective, Sound in Liquid, Distant Ventriloquism, Caricature Illusion, Close-up Sound Illusion, Point-blank Sound Illusion, etc.
He was hired by Indian Railways as a cultural representative and he currently works for South Central Railways, Hyderabad, India.
He appears very often on various Telugu television channels.
Srinivos performs in English, Hindi, Urdu, Tamil, and Telugu.

Titles and Awards
He has received various titles and awards over the past 38 years.

References 

 https://web.archive.org/web/20091229185531/http://www.123oye.com/mimicry-careers.htm
 https://web.archive.org/web/20090819115815/http://www.telugucinema.com/c/publish/news/tana_jul3.php
 http://www.mimicryinstitute.com

External links 
 

Ventriloquists
Indian impressionists (entertainers)
Telugu people
People from Warangal
Living people
1961 births